A semi-automatic shotgun is a repeating shotgun with a semi-automatic action, i.e. capable of automatically chambering a new shell after each firing, but requires individual trigger-pull to manually actuate each shot.  Semi-automatic shotguns use gas operation, blowback, or recoil operation to cycle the action, eject the empty shell, and load another round.

Many semi-automatic shotguns also provide an optional manual means of operation such as by pump action or a charging handle.

Examples
Notable semi-automatic shotguns include:

Akdal MKA 1919
Armsel Striker-12
Baikal MP-153 
Benelli M1014
Beretta 1301
Beretta AL391
Beretta Xtrema 2
Browning Auto-5
Daewoo USAS-12
Franchi Special Purpose Shotgun 12
Franchi SPAS-15
High Standard Model 10

Ithaca Mag-10
IWI Tavor TS12
Mossberg 9200
Mossberg 930
Remington Model 1100
Remington Model 11-87
Remington Model SP-10
Saiga-12 ("Сайга-12")
Sjögren shotgun
Smith & Wesson Model 1000
SRM Arms Model 1216
Vepr-12
Weatherby SA-08

See also

List of shotguns
Assault weapon
Automatic shotgun
Personal defense weapon
Semi-automatic firearm